Our Lady Star of the Sea Church, or variations, may refer to the following churches:

Australia
 St Mary Star of the Sea (Peppermint Grove, Western Australia)
 Our Lady Star of the Sea Church & School, Gladstone, Queensland
 St Mary Star of the Sea, West Melbourne, Victoria

United Kingdom
 Our Lady Star of the Sea and St Winefride, Amlwch, Anglesey, Wales
 St Mary Star of the Sea Church, Hastings, East Sussex, England
 Our Lady Star of the Sea Church, Lowestoft, Suffolk, England
 Our Lady Star of the Sea, Seaforth, Merseyside, England
 Church of Our Lady Star of the Sea, Wallasey, Merseyside, England
 Our Ladye Star of the Sea, Greenwich, London, England
 Our Lady Star of the Sea, a Roman Catholic school in Horden, County Durham, England

United States
 Mary Star of the Sea Catholic Church, San Pedro, California
 Our Lady Star of the Sea Church (Stamford, Connecticut)
 Basilica of St. Mary Star of the Sea (Key West, Florida)
 Star of the Sea Painted Church, Kalapana, Hawaii
 St. Mary, Star of the Sea (Baltimore, Maryland)
 Our Lady Star of the Sea Catholic Church (Solomons, Maryland)
 St. Mary Star of the Sea Catholic Church (Jackson, Michigan)
 Church of Our Lady Star of the Sea (Staten Island), New York
 St. Mary Star of the Sea (Newport, Vermont)

Other countries
 Our Lady, Star of the Sea & St Maughold Church, Ramsey, Isle of Man
 Stella Maris Church, Sliema (The Archpresbyterial church and matrice of Our Lady Star of the Sea), Malta
 Church of Our Lady Star of the Sea, Singapore
 Mary Star of the Sea Church, Grand Case, Saint Martin

See also
 Stella Maris (disambiguation) (Latin, 'star of the sea')
 Mary Star of the Sea (disambiguation) 
 Star of the Sea (disambiguation)
 Our Lady, Star of the Sea, an ancient title for the Virgin Mary
 Our Lady Star of the Sea High School (Michigan)
 Patronage of the Blessed Virgin Mary